"Dixie Lullaby" is a song by American country music artist Pat Green.  It was released in October 2006 as the second single from the album Cannonball.  The song reached #24 on the Billboard Hot Country Songs chart. Green wrote the song, along with Patrick Davis and Justin Pollard.

Critical reception
A review by Kevin John Coyne of countryuniverse.net stated:

Music video
The music video was directed by Trey Fanjoy.

The video debuted at number 18 on CMT's Top Twenty Countdown for the week of February 22, 2007.

Chart performance

References

2006 singles
2006 songs
Pat Green songs
Songs written by Pat Green
Song recordings produced by Don Gehman
BNA Records singles
Songs about fathers